Anil Rajbhar is the cabinet minister of Uttar Pradesh. Currently, he is additional minister in charge of district Ballia and Bahraich. He belongs to Tehsil Sakaldiha District- Chandauli, Uttar Pradesh. He has started his political journey as the president of the Sakaldiha Degree College after that he has joined Samajwadi Party (SP).

Political career
Anil Rajbhar got the ministries of pichhda varg kalyan and divyang jan.

References

Living people
Bharatiya Janata Party politicians from Uttar Pradesh
Uttar Pradesh MLAs 2017–2022
People from Chandauli
Yogi ministry
Samajwadi Party politicians
Uttar Pradesh MLAs 2022–2027
1973 births